Vizzini  is a town and comune in the province of Catania, on the island of Sicily. It may also refer to:

Vizzini, character in William Goldman's novel, see The Princess Bride
Vizzini (surname)

See also
 Vezzini (disambiguation)